The 2017 Food City 300 was the 22nd stock car race of the 2017 NASCAR Xfinity Series season and the 36th iteration of the event. The race was held on Friday, August 18, 2017, in Bristol, Tennessee at Bristol Motor Speedway, a 0.533 miles (0.858 km) permanent oval-shaped racetrack. The race took the scheduled 300 laps to complete. At race's end, Kyle Busch, driving for Joe Gibbs Racing, put on a dominating performance, leading 186 laps for his 91st career NASCAR Xfinity Series win, and his fifth of he season. To fill out the podium, Daniel Suárez, driving for Joe Gibbs Racing, and Elliott Sadler, driving for JR Motorsports, would finish second and third, respectively.

Background 
The race was held at Bristol Motor Speedway, which is a NASCAR short track venue located in Bristol, Tennessee. Constructed in 1960, it held its first NASCAR race on July 30, 1961. Bristol is among the most popular tracks on the NASCAR schedule because of its distinct features, which include extraordinarily steep banking, an all-concrete surface, two pit roads, and stadium-like seating. It has also been named one of the loudest NASCAR tracks. The track is billed as the "World's Fastest Half-Mile", even though that designation technically belongs to the Volusia Speedway Park dirt track.

Entry list 

 (R) denotes rookie driver.
 (i) denotes driver who is ineligible for series driver points.

Practice

First practice 
The first 55-minute practice session was held on Thursday, August 17, at 1:00 PM EST.

Final practice 
The final 55-minute practice session was held on Thursday, August 17, at 3:00 PM CST.

Qualifying 
Qualifying was held on Friday, August 18, at 3:40 PM EST. Since Bristol Motor Speedway is under 2 miles (3.2 km), the qualifying system was a multi-car system that included three rounds. The first round was 15 minutes, where every driver would be able to set a lap within the 15 minutes. Then, the second round would consist of the fastest 24 cars in Round 1, and drivers would have 10 minutes to set a lap. Round 3 consisted of the fastest 12 drivers from Round 2, and the drivers would have 5 minutes to set a time. Whoever was fastest in Round 3 would win the pole.

Due to a delayed start because of inclement weather, qualifying would only be one 20-minute session.

Reed Sorenson and Morgan Shepherd would fail to qualify.

Full qualifying results

Race results 
Stage 1 Laps: 85 

Stage 2 Laps: 85 

Stage 3 Laps: 130

Standings after the race 

Drivers' Championship standings

Note: Only the first 12 positions are included for the driver standings.

References 

2017 NASCAR Xfinity Series
NASCAR races at Bristol Motor Speedway
August 2017 sports events in the United States
2017 in sports in Tennessee